Ronald Ian Grahame (born June 7, 1950) is a Canadian former professional ice hockey goaltender. He played four seasons in the National Hockey League and four in World Hockey Association between 1973 and 1981.

Playing career
After a collegiate career with the University of Denver during which he was named a First Team All-American, Grahame was signed by the Houston Aeros of the WHA. He played a season for the minor league Macon Whoopees in 1973 before coming up to the Aeros at the end of the season. In the 1974–75 season he made the Aeros for good, leading the WHA in wins, shutouts and goals against average and backstopping the club to the AVCO World Trophy, winning both the Ben Hatskin Trophy for best goaltender, First Team All-Star accolades and the WHA Playoff MVP. His following two seasons saw an equal degree of success, including a Second Team All-Star berth in 1976 and a second Hatskin award in 1977.

He became a free agent after the 1977 season and signed with the NHL's Boston Bruins for the 1977–78 NHL season. He continued his starring play, having a fine season as the Bruins' number one goaltender. After that season, however, he was traded to the Los Angeles Kings for a first-round draft pick in the 1979 draft (which turned into Ray Bourque), and played poorly thereafter. He served with the Kings for three seasons before being sold to the Quebec Nordiques in December, 1980. He played eight games for the Nordiques before being sent down to the minors for the remainder of the season, after which he retired.

Post-playing career
After retiring, Ron Grahame worked as the athletic director at the University of Denver, where he worked with the hockey team. He also conducted goalie clinics for ice hockey and inline hockey goaltenders

In 2007 Grahame began his second year as Senior Associate Athletics Director, and his 14th year as an administrator at the University of Denver. He was responsible for the overall supervision of all 17 varsity sport programs at Denver.

Grahame graduated from the University of Denver in 1973 with a B.A. in physical education and was one of the most successful hockey players in school history. After retiring from playing, he returned to Denver as an assistant coach from 1982 to 1989.

Ron and his wife Charlotte have two sons, John, an NHL goaltender who won the Stanley Cup in 2004 with the Tampa Bay Lightning, and Jason, who graduated from the University of Denver in 2003 and now lives in Vancouver. Ron and Charlotte reside in Denver. Charlotte and John are the only mother/son combination to have their names engraved on the Stanley Cup (Charlotte was a member of the Colorado Avalanche executive management during their 2001 Stanley Cup season).

Awards and honours

Career statistics

Regular season and playoffs

See also
 List of family relations in the NHL

References

External links

1950 births
Living people
AHCA Division I men's ice hockey All-Americans
Binghamton Whalers players
Boston Bruins players
Canadian ice hockey goaltenders
Denver Pioneers men's ice hockey players
Houston Aeros (WHA) players
Ice hockey people from British Columbia
Los Angeles Kings players
Macon Whoopees (SHL) players
Quebec Nordiques players
Sportspeople from Victoria, British Columbia
Undrafted National Hockey League players
Victoria Cougars (BCJHL) players